Polymer-bonded explosives, also called PBX or plastic-bonded explosives, are explosive materials in which explosive powder is bound together in a matrix using small quantities (typically 5–10% by weight) of a synthetic polymer. PBXs are normally used for explosive materials that are not easily melted into a casting, or are otherwise difficult to form. 

PBX was first developed in 1952 at Los Alamos National Laboratory, as RDX embedded in polystyrene with dioctyl phthalate plasticizer. HMX compositions with teflon-based binders were developed in 1960s and 1970s for gun shells and for Apollo Lunar Surface Experiments Package (ALSEP) seismic experiments, although the latter experiments are usually cited as using hexanitrostilbene (HNS).

Potential advantages 
Polymer-bonded explosives have several potential advantages:
 If the polymer matrix is an elastomer (rubbery material), it tends to absorb shocks, making the PBX very insensitive to accidental detonation, and thus ideal for insensitive munitions.
 Hard polymers can produce PBX that is very rigid and maintains a precise engineering shape even under severe stress.
 PBX powders can be pressed into a particular shape at room temperature, which when casting normally requires hazardous melting of the explosive. High pressure pressing can achieve density for the material very close to the theoretical crystal density of the base explosive material.
 Many PBXes are safe to machine—to turn solid blocks into complex three-dimensional shapes. For example, a billet of PBX can, if necessary, be precisely shaped on a lathe or CNC machine. This technique is used to machine explosive lenses necessary for modern nuclear weapons.

Binders

Fluoropolymers 

Fluoropolymers are advantageous as binders due to their high density (yielding high detonation velocity) and inert chemical behavior (yielding long shelf stability and low aging). They are somewhat brittle, as their glass transition temperature is at room temperature or above. This limits their use to insensitive explosives (e.g. TATB) where the brittleness does not have detrimental effects on safety. They are also difficult to process.

Elastomers 

Elastomers have to be used with more mechanically sensitive explosives like HMX. The elasticity of the matrix lowers sensitivity of the bulk material to shock and friction; their glass transition temperature is chosen to be below the lower boundary of the temperature working range (typically below -55 °C). Crosslinked rubber polymers are however sensitive to aging, mostly by action of free radicals and by hydrolysis of the bonds by traces of water vapor. Rubbers like Estane or hydroxyl-terminated polybutadiene (HTPB) are used for these applications extensively. Silicone rubbers and thermoplastic polyurethanes are also in use.

Fluoroelastomers, e.g. Viton, combine the advantages of both.

Energetic polymers 
Energetic polymers (e.g. nitro or azido derivates of polymers) can be used as a binder to increase the explosive power in comparison with inert binders. Energetic plasticizers can be also used. The addition of a plasticizer lowers the sensitivity of the explosive and improves its processibility.

Insults (potential explosive inhibitors) 
Explosive yields can be affected by the introduction of mechanical loads or the application of temperature; such damages are called insults. The mechanism of a thermal insult at low temperatures on an explosive is primarily thermomechanical, at higher temperatures it is primarily thermochemical.

Thermomechanical 
Thermomechanical mechanisms involve stresses by thermal expansion (namely differential thermal expansions, as thermal gradients tend to be involved), melting/freezing or sublimation/condensation of components, and phase transitions of crystals (e.g. transition of HMX from beta phase to delta phase at 175 °C involves a large change in volume and causes extensive cracking of its crystals).

Thermochemical 
Thermochemical changes involve decomposition of the explosives and binders, loss of strength of binder as it softens or melts, or stiffening of the binder if the increased temperature causes crosslinking of the polymer chains. The changes can also significantly alter the porosity of the material, whether by increasing it (fracturing of crystals, vaporization of components) or decreasing it (melting of components). The size distribution of the crystals can be also altered, e.g. by Ostwald ripening. Thermochemical decomposition starts to occur at the crystal nonhomogeneities, e.g. intragranular interfaces between crystal growth zones, on damaged parts of the crystals, or on interfaces of different materials (e.g. crystal/binder). Presence of defects in crystals (cracks, voids, solvent inclusions...) may increase the explosive's sensitivity to mechanical shocks.

Some example PBXs

References 

 Cooper, Paul W. Explosives Engineering. New York: Wiley-VCH, 1996. .
 Norris, Robert S., Hans M. Kristensen, and Joshua Handler. "The B61 family of bombs", http://thebulletin.org, The Bulletin of the Atomic Scientists, Jan/Feb 2003.

 
Explosives